Pesnica is a geographical name that may refer to:

 Pesnica (river), a river in northeastern Slovenia
 Pesnica pri Mariboru, a settlement in Municipality of Pesnica, northeastern Slovenia
 Municipality of Pesnica, a municipality in northeastern Slovenia
 Pesnica, Kungota, a settlement in Municipality of Kungota, northeastern Slovenia